Tortyra chalcobathra is a moth of the family Choreutidae. It is known from Brazil.

The wingspan is 11–13 mm. The forewings are blackish with a shining brassy wedge-shaped streak from the base of the costa above the dorsum to one/fifth, edged above with black on the costal half, beyond this a band of whitish speckling extending to the fascia. There is a moderately broad slightly curved shining brassy fascia at two-fifths, edged on each side with black, followed by a fascia of whitish speckling narrow on the dorsum, gradually expanded to above the middle, where it extends to three-fifths, then rapidly narrowed to
the costa. A coppery-purple posterior patch, its edge convex, runs from the costa just before the apex to the dorsum beyond the middle. The hindwings are dark fuscous.

References

Tortyra
Moths described in 1922